The 1904 New South Wales state election was held on 6 August 1904 for all of the 90 seats in the 20th New South Wales Legislative Assembly and it was conducted in single-member constituencies with a first past the post voting system. For the first time, women were entitled to vote. Both adult males and females were entitled to vote, but not Indigenous people. The 19th parliament of New South Wales was dissolved on 16 July 1904 by the Governor, Sir Harry Rawson, on the advice of the Premier, Thomas Waddell.

This election saw the size of the Legislative Assembly reduced from 125 to 90 seats as a result of the 1903 New South Wales referendum.

Key dates

Results

{{Australian elections/Title row
| table style = float:right;clear:right;margin-left:1em;
| title        = New South Wales state election, 6 August 1904
| house        = Legislative Assembly
| series       = New South Wales state election
| back         = 1901
| forward      = 1907
| enrolled     = 689,490
| total_votes  = 396,622
| turnout %    = 59.31
| turnout chg  = −3.53
| informal     = 3,973
| informal %   = 0.99
| informal chg = +0.21
}}

|}

Retiring members

See also
 Candidates of the 1904 New South Wales state election
 Members of the New South Wales Legislative Assembly, 1904–1907

References

1904 New South Wales state election
1904 elections in Australia
1904 New South Wales state election
August 1904 events